Eagle Aviation may refer to one of several airlines:

 Eagle Aviation Limited was a United Kingdom airline that became British Eagle
 Eagle Aviation France (ICAO Code EGN) is an airline based in France
 Eagle Aviation Canada was e Canadian airline based in Silver Falls Water Aerodrome
 Eagle Aviation Columbia is a charter airline based in West Columbia, South Carolina
 Eagle Aviation LLC, a United States aircraft manufacturer based in Oshkosh, Wisconsin 
 Eagle Aviation Spearfish is a charter airline based in Spearfish, South Dakota
 Cretan Eagle Aviation is a charter airline based in Greece

See also
 Eagle Air (disambiguation)